Gaillardia multiceps, the onion blanketflower, is a North American species of flowering plant in the sunflower family. It is native to the southwestern United States (Arizona, New Mexico, western Texas).

Gaillardia multiceps grows in gypseous soils, including sand dunes. Each head has 8 red ray flowers surrounding 80-100 disc flowers, yellow with purple tips.

References

multiceps
Flora of Arizona
Flora of New Mexico
Flora of Texas
Endemic flora of the United States
Plants described in 1897
Taxa named by Edward Lee Greene
Flora without expected TNC conservation status